The 2022 Montana Grizzlies football team represented the University of Montana as a member of the Big Sky Conference during the 2022 NCAA Division I FCS football season. The Grizzlies were led by 12th-year head coach Bobby Hauck and played their home games at Washington–Grizzly Stadium in Missoula, Montana.

Previous season
The Grizzlies finished the season 10–3, 6–2 to finish in a tie for 3rd place. They received an at-large bid to the FCS playoffs, where they defeated Eastern Washington in the second round before losing to James Madison in the quarterfinals.

Preseason

Polls
On July 25, 2022, during the virtual Big Sky Kickoff, the Grizzlies were predicted to finish first in the Big Sky by both the coaches and media.

Preseason All–Big Sky team
The Grizzlies had five players selected to the preseason all-Big Sky team.

Offense

Malik Flowers – WR

Defense

Patrick O'Connell – LB

Alex Gubner – DT

Robby Hauck – S

Justin Ford – CB

Schedule

Game summaries

Northwestern State

South Dakota

at Indiana State

Portland State

at Idaho State

Idaho

at No. 2 Sacramento State

at No. 5т Weber State

Cal Poly

Eastern Washington

at No. 3 Montana State

FCS Playoffs

No. 14 Southeast Missouri State – First Round

at No. 4 North Dakota State – Second Round

Ranking movements

References

Montana
Montana Grizzlies football seasons
Montana Grizzlies football
Montana